Kanakachevo (Qanaqas) is a rural locality (a village) in Mrakovsky Selsoviet, Kugarchinsky District, Bashkortostan, Russia. The population was 100 as of 2010. There are 2 streets.

Geography 
Kanakachevo is located 12 km southwest of Mrakovo (the district's administrative centre) by road. Novonikolayevskoye is the nearest rural locality.

References 

Rural localities in Kugarchinsky District